Cappella della Beata Vergine di Lourdes (Chapel of Our Lady of Lourdes; also known as Chiesetta di Grava) is a Roman Catholic chapel located in Cortina d'Ampezzo's Grava di Sotto neighborhood. Built in 1907, it contains elements by the artist Corrado Pitscheider of the Val Gardena. Its feast day is celebrated on 11 February. The interior features a spacious nave, an altar, and the Lourdes grotto. The space is lit by large windows. There are statues of the Virgin and Santa Bernadette, as well as St. Lucia and St. Michael the Archangel. A framed canvas of St. Joseph with the Child hangs in the presbytery.

Gallery

References

Bolcato, Vittorio: Gli organi delle chiese di Cortina d'Ampezzo, Edizioni La Cooperativa di Cortina, 2002. . 
AA.VV.:Pietre Vive, Edizioni La Cooperativa di Cortina, Cortina, 2011. . 

Buildings and structures in Cortina d'Ampezzo
Churches in the province of Belluno
Roman Catholic churches completed in 1907
1907 establishments in Italy
20th-century Roman Catholic church buildings in Italy